Utah State Route 205 may refer to:
Utah State Route 205 (1939-1953)
Utah State Route 205 (1963-1964)
Utah State Route 205 (1965-1969)